Kudai are a Chilean pop rock band from Santiago, Chile, formed in early 2000. The group is composed of Pablo Holman, Bábara Sepúlveda, Tomás Manzi, and Nicole Natalino, who left the group in 2006 citing personal reasons, and was replaced by Ecuadorian Gabriela Villalba for three years. After the group disbanded in 2010, in November 2016, the band confirmed their return to the scene with the original members.

Originally beginning their career as a children band named CIAO, they rose to international fame when they changed their name and musical style with their debut album Vuelo (2004), which was a worldwide success, reaching triple platinum status in Chile, and selling over 500,000 copies worldwide. Their third studio album Nadha (2008) was nominated for Best Pop Album by Group or Duet at the 9th Annual Latin Grammy Awards, and was critically acclaimed. They are well known for hit songs, such as "Sin Despertar", "Ya Nada Queda", "Déjame Gritar", "Lejos De Aquí" and "Morir De Amor".

Kudai had a resounding commercial success in Latin America, and marked an entire generation with their musical style and lyricism. Often labeled by the media as an "emo band", a sobriquet based on their image, Kudai is characterized by lyrics about transcendental topics for youth such as depression, domestic violence, suicide, ecology, homosexuality and toxic relationships.

History

1999–2002: Ciao
Pablo Vega, a Mexican producer and manager based in Chile, formed a children's group called "Ciao" late 1999. Initially, the group included Nicole Natalino and Tomás Manzi, and later, Bárbara Sepúlveda, who auditioned, and replaced another girl who could not continue within the musical project. Finally, the group was formed by the fourth member, Pablo Holman, who joined "Ciao" by a reference, because his father is a well-known musician from Chile and acquaintance of Vega. The concept of "Ciao" consisted of a group of children each represented by a color –Pablo, blue; Barbara, fuchsia; Nicole, purple and Tomás, green – who performed Italian pop hits.

Ciao released their first and only album studio, El Poder de los Niños, early 2002 by EMI Odeón Chilena. Two singles from the album were promoted on Chilean radio stations, "Será Porque Te Amo" and "Mamma María", both of which contained its own music videos. For two years, Ciao made appearances on television shows, until the group transitioned into a teen concept.

2003–2005: Foundation of Kudai, and Vuelo

The group began accepting song submissions and concentrating on performing original material in hopes of breaking out of its niche market. Their reinvention was complete after changing their name from CIAO to Kudai, which is derived from the Mapudungun (native Chilean language) word , which according to the bandmembers means "young worker." In 2004 the group, now composed of four vocalists (Pablo, Tomas, Barbara, and Nicole), released its debut record, entitled Vuelo (Flight). Thanks to a string of successful singles, Vuelo soon achieved platinum record status. The group began its steady climb to the top with a Best New Artist nomination from MTV Latin American video music awards for their music video  from the first single "Sin Despertar", quickly escalated to the first places of Chilean music rankings. Soon, they released their second single, "Ya Nada Queda", which achieved great success as did their third single, "Escapar". Vuelo went platinum in August 2005.
Kudai was nominated for Best Artist—Central Region and Best New Artist—Central Region in the MTV Video Music Awards Latin America 2005. They released their first DVD, which included their 2004–2005 Tour, in September 2005 called En Vivo - Gira 2004–2005. The album was released in Mexico in July 2006 with a different cover with the same tracks. The album sold more of 500,000 copies worldwide.

2006–2007: Sobrevive, their second studio album

In 2006, they recorded their second album called Sobrevive released on June 15, 2006 this album debuted at #1 in Chile as one of the most sold albums of the year and gained the gold album status for selling over 15,000 copies. The album was released in 2007 in Mexico and sold more than 350,000 copies worldwide.

This album was the last record on which Nicole Natalino sang. She left the group due to personal problems.  After the departure of Nicole, Gabriela Villalba replaced her and re-recorded the album featuring Gabriela's voice; this was released on September 26, 2007 in Chile. The album represented a drastic change in their style with a heavier  sound and darker lyrics about anorexia, teenage pregnancy, drug addiction & suicide.

The first single is "Déjame Gritar" which reached #1 in Chile and Argentina. The video of the single features Nicole before her departure and also hit the #1 spot on many music video channels and programs in Latin America and reached #1 on MTV Latin America's TRL Los 10+ Pedidos in Argentina and Top 20. She became a permanent member of the group, and now contributes to the group's excellent trajectory. The second single is "Llévame" and this performs at all Gabriela Villalba. The video also features the new member and it was filmed in the Andes in Chile. This version of the record was promoted in Latinamerica. In addition to replacing Nicole, the track listing also changed a bit. The song "Si He Tocado El Suelo" was removed and a new one titled "Tú replaced it"

They also performed the theme for the MTV Latin America's show, Quiero mis Quince (English: My Super Sweet 16). On October 19, 2006, the group won the MTV Latin American video music awards award for Best Central Artist and Best Pop Artist, which they dedicated to both their fans and Nicole. After the success of the group, they were invited to the Viña del Mar Festival in February 2007. On October 2, 2007 their released the first live album (fourth overall) called En Vivo: Desde Mexico.

2008–2010: Nadha

Towards the end of 2007 they moved to Mexico to launch their international career and left Chile. Kudai closed their career in Chile when they played in the Festival de Viña del Mar, which was their last presentation in the country until now. Kudai has revolutionized punk and rock music in Latin America. They recorded their third studio album called Nadha. The album has 12 songs, of which six were written by producer Koko Stambuk (ex-musician of Glup!). Three other songs are from producer Carlos Lara, who is considered to be the creator of RBD and has collaborated with musicians such as Lynda Thomas and Ricky Martin. Cathy Lean (Ex-Mal Corazón), from Chile, also wrote two of the album's songs. Kudai chose to interpret the songs of Alanis Morissette and her band's bassist Eric Avery (ex-Jane's Addiction). The album was mastered at a Los Angeles studio, Igloo Music, under the direction of Gustavo Borner, who has worked with well-known artists such as Diego Torres, Ricky Martin, Sin Bandera, Phil Collins, Plácido Domingo and N'Sync, as well as working on the motion picture soundtracks of Rush Hour 2, Miami Vice and Finding Nemo.

Kudai band member Gabriela Villalba has said that this album is a turning point in Kudai's musical career:
"Now is the time that Kudai needs to show and prove many things because if we remain the same, we will be categorized as the teen band that will never grow. I feel that this third album is a very decisive stage for Kudai. We are going to fight to rid ourselves from the title of "the band that wants to be popular" and actually present good material."

Rumors say Kudai might be performing in World Peace One in 2008. The group might be playing in Berlin, Germany, though other sources claim they might be playing in Puerto Rico. They appeared also in one episode of Skimo and performed "Déjame Gritar". Their album Nadha made hit in stores on May 3, 2008 in Chile and released in the all Latin America in Mexico obtained gold certification for their sales. On May 12, 2008, Kudai premiered their new music video with the Mexican music group, RBD and Eiza González called "Estar Bien" (Be Well). The song is part of a campaign for obesity, anorexia, and bulimia awareness, and for being well, happy, and getting active in Mexico. The video shows the singers on a tour bus singing around Mexico City while citizens do various stretches and cardiovascular exercises. On August 5, 2008 the band will make debut in the United States market with their first album released there. On July 21, 2008 their second single of Nadha, "Nada Es Igual" was released in Latin America.

The album has been nominated for "Best Pop Album by Group or Duet" at the Latin Grammy Awards to be held at the Toyota Center in Houston, Texas on 13 November.

In January 2009, they released an exclusive single for Chile, called "Hoy Quiero" with moderate success. On January 22, 2009, they released as a single the song "Ladrando a La Luna" for the 2008 Disney's movie Bolt.

2016-present: Reunion 
In November 2016, the band announced their comeback with the original line-up, as former member Nicole Natalino confirmed the reunion with their bandmates. They also confirmed the release of a new song recorded recently.

Members

Current members 
 Pablo Holman – vocals, occasionally guitars (1999–2009; 2016–present)
 Bárbara Sepúlveda – vocals (1999–2009; 2016–present)
 Tomás Manzi – vocals (1999–2009; 2016–present)
 Nicole Natalino – vocals (1999–2006; 2016–present)

Former members 
 Gabriela Villalba – vocals (2006–2009)

Discography

Studio albums
 Vuelo (2004)
 Sobrevive (2006)
 Nadha (2008)
 Laberinto (2019)
 Revuelo (2021)

Tours

Awards and nominations

Latin Grammy Awards
A Latin Grammy Award is an accolade by the Latin Academy of Recording Arts & Sciences to recognize outstanding achievement in the music industry. Earned a nomination Kudai.

|-
| 2008 || Nadha || Best Pop Album by a Duo or Group with Vocals || 
|-

Los Premios MTV Latinoamérica
Los Premios MTV Latinoamérica or VMALA's is the Latin American version of the Video Music Awards. Kudai won five awards from sixteen nominations.

|-
| 2005 || Kudai || Best New Artist — Central || 
|-
| 2005 || Kudai || Best Artist — Central || 
|-
| 2006 || Kudai || Breakthrough Artist || 
|-
| 2006 || Kudai || Best Pop Artist || 
|-
| 2006 || Kudai || Best Artist — Central || 
|-
| 2007 || Kudai || Artist of the Year || 
|-
| 2007 || Kudai || Best Group or Duet || 
|-
| 2007 || Kudai || Best Artist — Central || 
|-
| 2007 || Pablo Holman || Fashionista — Male || 
|-
| 2008 || Kudai || Best Group or Duet || 
|-
| 2008 || Kudai || Best Pop Artist || 
|-
| 2008 || Kudai || Best Artist — Central || 
|-
| 2008 || Gabriela Villalba || Fashionista — Female || 
|-
| 2008 || Kudai (President: Martín Torrilla) || Best Fan Club || 
|-
| 2009 || Kudai || Artist of the Year || 
|-
| 2009 || Kudai || Best Artist — Central || 
|-

Los Premios 40 Principales
Los Premios 40 Principales, is an award show by the musical radio station Los 40 Principales. Created in 2006 to celebrate the fortieth anniversary of the founding of the worldwide station. Kudai won an award.

|-
| 2007 || Kudai || Chilean Act || 
|-
| 2008 || Kudai || Chilean Act || 
|-

Orgullosamente Latino Award
The Orgullosamente Latino Awards are accolades first awarded in 2004 for the best in Latin music. They were created by Alexis Núñes Oliva, Executive Producer of Ritmoson Latino, the Mexico-based music television channel through which the awards are broadcast each year. Kudai won two awards from four nominations.

|-
| 2006 || Kudai || Latin Group of the Year || 
|-
| 2007 || Kudai || Latin Group of the Year || 
|-
| 2009 || Kudai || Latin Group of the Year || 
|-
| 2009 || Lejos De Aquí || Latin Music Video of the Year || 
|-

Premios Oye!
Premios Oye! (Premio Nacional a la Música Grabada) are presented annually by the Academia Nacional de la Música en México for outstanding achievements in the Mexican record industry. Kudai received an award from two nominations.

|-
| 2008 || Nadha || Best Pop by a Duo/Group || 
|-
| 2008 || Lejos De Aquí || Best Song with a Message || 
|-

References

External links

  Official site
  Kudai Nadha

Capitol Records artists
Latin pop music groups
Musical groups established in 1999
Musical groups disestablished in 2010
Musical groups reestablished in 2016
1999 establishments in Chile
Chilean pop rock music groups